Wurtele or Würtele is the surname of the following people:

Heather Wurtele (born 1979), Canadian triathlete 
Jonathan Würtele (1792–1853), Canadian merchant and political figure
Jonathan Saxton Campbell Würtele (1828–1904), Canadian lawyer, judge and political figure, son of Jonathan
Rhona and Rhoda Wurtele (born 1922), identical twins and Canadian alpine skiers